Frank Thomas Holmes (1 April 1900 – 30 May 1989) was an Australian rules footballer who played with North Melbourne in the Victorian Football League (VFL).

Notes

External links 

1900 births
1989 deaths
Australian rules footballers from Victoria (Australia)
North Melbourne Football Club players